Eric Price (27 October 1918 – 13 July 2002) was an English first-class cricketer. He played for Lancashire between 1946 and 1947 and for Essex between 1948 and 1949.

References

External links

1918 births
2002 deaths
English cricketers
Essex cricketers
Lancashire cricketers
North v South cricketers